Darija Jurak and Anastasia Rodionova were the defending champions, but Rodionova chose not to participate this year. Jurak played alongside Pauline Parmentier, but lost in the first round to Monica Puig and Sloane Stephens.

Tatjana Maria and Heather Watson won the title, defeating Kaitlyn Christian and Sabrina Santamaria in the final, 7–5, 2–6, [10–2].

Seeds

Draw

Draw

References
Main Draw

2018 Abierto Mexicano Telcel
Abierto Mexicano Telcel - Women's Doubles